Boss of Bosses is a 2001 American made-for-TV movie about the life of former Gambino crime family boss Paul Castellano directed by Dwight H. Little. It stars Chazz Palminteri as Paul Castellano, Patricia Mauceri as his wife Nina, Mark Margolis as Joseph Armone, and Angela Alvarado as his mistress Gloria Olarte.

Overview
The film focuses on Paul growing up, becoming disenchanted with his working class lifestyle, spending time and being influenced by his cousin Carlo Gambino, his friendship with Joseph Armone and Tommy Bilotti, and also on his growing relationship with his maid Gloria. The film serves as a companion piece to Gotti. As "Boss of Bosses" climaxes with Paul Castellano's murder, while Gotti focuses on the events before, during and after the murder.

The film documents his rocky relationship with his soldiers, along with friend Neil Dellacroce, and climaxes when he attends the famous "meeting" at Sparks Steak House, where he and his bodyguard/underboss Tommy Bilotti are murdered as they exit their vehicle in an ambush arranged by John Gotti.

Cast 
 Chazz Palminteri as Paul Castellano
 Angela Alvarado as Gloria Olarte
 Jay O. Sanders as Joseph O'Brien
 Clancy Brown as Andris Kurins
 Richard Foronjy as Tommy Bilotti
 Mark Margolis as Joseph "Piney" Armone
 Dayton Callie as Neil Dellacroce
 Patricia Mauceri as Nina Castellano
 Al Ruscio as Carlo Gambino
 Sonny Marinelli as John Gotti
 Philip Williams as Nino Gaggi
 Steven Bauer as Vito Genovese
 Yani Gellman as Young Paul Castellano
 William DeMeo as Young Carlo Gambino
 Carlos Díaz as Philip Castellano
 Gerry Mendicino as Father Vicente
 Ron Gabriel as Thomas Agro
 Michael A. Miranda as Roy DeMeo
 Vito Rezza as Angelo Ruggiero
 Tony Nappo as Gene Gotti
 Gino Marrocco as Carmine Persico
 Tony Perri as Anthony Salerno

References

External links 

2001 television films
2001 films
2000s biographical films
2001 crime drama films
American crime drama films
Biographical films about gangsters
Films about the American Mafia
Films directed by Dwight H. Little
Films set in New York City
Gambino crime family
Cultural depictions of Paul Castellano
Cultural depictions of Carlo Gambino
Cultural depictions of Vito Genovese
Cultural depictions of John Gotti
American drama television films
2000s English-language films
2000s American films